Thomas Vernon Wollaston  (9 March 1822 – 4 January 1878) was a prominent English entomologist and malacologist, becoming especially known for his studies of Coleoptera inhabiting several North Atlantic archipelagoes. He was well-placed socially. His religious beliefs effectively prevented him from supporting Charles Darwin's theories after 1859, but Darwin remained a close friend. Wollaston supported the theory that continental lands had once extended outward farther to encompass some of the island groups he studied.

Life
Thomas Vernon Wollaston was born in Scotter, Lincolnshire, England, in 1822. In 1845 he gained a B.A. degree from Jesus College, Cambridge, and in 1847 he was made a fellow of the Linnean Society.

Wollaston spent the winter of 1847–1848 in Madeira, returning for his Cambridge M.A. graduation in 1849. In the years to 1855 he made four long trips to Madeira. 
 
In 1857 Wollaston returned to the North Atlantic islands, investigating the natural history of the Canary Islands – with Richard Thomas Lowe and John Edward Gray in 1858, returning with Lowe alone in 1859. After a long and rather mysterious absence he returned to the islands in 1866, this time to Cape Verde Islands with Lowe and Gray. Wollaston was a frequent correspondent with the geologist Charles Lyell and their letters are in the Centre for Research Collections, Edinburgh University Library. Wollaston was also a friendly correspondent with Charles Darwin until 1860. His last trip was to St. Helena with his wife, and Gray.

In 1869, Wollaston married Edith, the youngest daughter of his friend Joseph Shepherd. Following their visit to St. Helena she wrote "Notes on the Lepidoptera of St. Helena, with Descriptions of new Species" which included 37 new species attributed to her.

Wollaston died at Teignmouth, Devon, England, in 1878.

His principal collection of Madeiran Coleoptera was purchased by the then Oxford University Museum (now Oxford University Museum of Natural History) whilst the British Museum purchased his principal collection of Canarian Coleoptera. They are now in the Natural History Museum. Both museums contain duplicate specimens from respective secondary collections. Material can also be found Cambridge University Museum of Zoology, Muséum National d’Histoire Naturelle, Paris, and California Academy of Sciences, San Francisco.

Selected works
 Insecta Maderensia (1854)
 On the Variation of Species, with Especial Reference to the Insecta (1856)
 Coleoptera Atlantidum (1865)
 Coleoptera Sanctæ-Helenæ (1877)
 Testacea Atlantica, or the land and freshwater shells of the Azores, Madeira, Salvages, Canaries, Cape Verdes, and Saint Helena (1878)

Wollaston also wrote many short, and some lengthy, papers on North Atlantic archipelago Coleoptera. A paper attributed to Wollaston on the Diptera of Madeira was almost certainly written by Alexander Henry Haliday.

References

Further reading
 
Oxford Dictionary of National Biography
Entomologist's Monthly Magazine, Vol. 14 (1877–1878): 213–215.
Archives of Natural History, Vol. 22 (1995): 333–348.

External links
T. Vernon Wollaston Un ėntomologo en la Macronesia Extensive Account 
 Gaedike, R.; Groll, E. K. & Taeger, A. 2012: Bibliography of the entomological literature from the beginning until 1863 : online database – version 1.0 – Senckenberg Deutsches Entomologisches Institut.
 
 

1822 births
1878 deaths
Fellows of the Linnean Society of London
English coleopterists
English malacologists
People from West Lindsey District